Lucas Ribeiro dos Santos (born 19 January 1999) is a Brazilian professional footballer who plays as a centre back for Bundesliga club 1899 Hoffenheim.

Club career

Vitória
Born in Salvador, Bahia, Ribeiro graduated from the youth academy of Vitória (after joining at the age of 16) and was promoted to the senior team in 2018.

On 23 August, he made his first team debut, playing the whole ninety minutes of a 1–0 defeat against Flamengo. Eight days later, he extended his contract until 2021.

Hoffenheim
On 28 January 2019, Ribeiro joined German club Hoffenheim and signed a contract until the summer of 2023.

Internacional 
He played only two games for Hoffenheim before joining Internacional on loan.

Ceará
On 18 January 2022, Ribeiro was loaned to Ceará for 2022 season.

International career
In October 2018, Ribeiro was called up to the Brazil under-20 for friendlies against Chile. On 13 December 2018, he was included in the under-20 team for the 2019 South American U-20 Championship. Ribeiro is regarded as one of the best emerging defenders to come out of Brazil. A bright future at international level is predicted for Ribeiro.

Career statistics

References

External links

1999 births
Living people
Association football central defenders
Sportspeople from Salvador, Bahia
Brazilian footballers
Campeonato Brasileiro Série A players
Bundesliga players
Esporte Clube Vitória players
Sport Club Internacional players
Ceará Sporting Club players
TSG 1899 Hoffenheim players
Brazilian expatriate footballers
Expatriate footballers in Germany
Brazilian expatriate sportspeople in Germany
Brazil youth international footballers
Brazil under-20 international footballers